Ploudaniel is a commune in the Finistère department of Brittany in north-western France.

Geography

Climate
Ploudaniel has a oceanic climate (Köppen climate classification Cfb).

Population
Inhabitants of Ploudaniel are called in French Ploudaniélois.

Breton language
The municipality launched a linguistic plan through Ya d'ar brezhoneg on 2 February 2007.

See also
Communes of the Finistère department
List of the works of the Maître de Guimiliau
List of the works of the Maître de Thégonnec

References

External links

Official website

Mayors of Finistère Association 

Communes of Finistère